Savannah Park Secondary School is a combined co-education public school in Savannah Park, KwaZulu-Natal, South Africa. The school motto is "Hope in Hard Work". The School colours are Royal Blue and Gold.

Savannah Park Secondary School was founded in 1996 as a co-educational for mainly previously disadvantaged pupils. It is located on 17 Pebble Drive, Savannah Park. It currently on average has 1400 pupils from Grade 0-12 and a staff of 40 under the leadership of Mr A S Naicker, the first and current Headmaster.

The badge includes the name Savannah Park Secondary School, a torch which represents the bright future the pupils attending should aim for, and a book which stands for education.

Savannah Park Secondary School offers the following subjects: Afrikaans (First Additional Language), English (Home Language), IsiZulu (Home Language & First Additional Language), Life Orientation, Mathematics, Mathematical Literacy, Physical Science, Life Sciences, History, Geography, Accounting, Business Studies, Engineering and Graphic Design, Computer Studies, Religious Studies & Tourism.

External links
 http://www.education.gov.za/LinkClick.aspx?fileticket=fNDm9kZSxG4%3D&t

Schools in KwaZulu-Natal